Piano City is a Social Music Game  for iOS developed and published by UK-based game development company Room 8 Studio. The game was released on September 24, 2014. Piano City is a music game that takes player to a journey, where he competes in different concert recitals while building up piano skills. The game also has a PvP mode, where anyone can play with other Piano City players.

Gameplay
Player starts at the School Hall with basic songs and progresses through the story, while improving skills, playing both classical music and modern hits. During the journey, players will collect different items and pass musical quests. The game has 4 main characters:

 Magnus - Piano master who will help the player to master his skills.
 Arthur - Young, arrogant but very promising pianist.
 Kim - A friend, that will support the player.
 Tom - Beginner pianist who is often offended by Arthur.

Reception
Piano City was honored by the iOS App Store and listed as #5 in Best Games of September collection and also reached #1 music game rank in 126 countries.

Updates
The game receives regular thematic updates dedicated to holidays.

 Update 1.3 (October 22) -  Halloween theme, more than 20 new melodies added (including SIA, PSY, Europe, Yiruma, Katy B), new halls added with more than 40 quests, new collections.
 Update 1.4 (Upcoming) - Christmas theme, new melodies, halls, renewed game balance, bug fixes.

List of compositions

References

IOS games